Established in January 2005, the University System of Maryland at Hagerstown is a facility located in Hagerstown, Maryland that offers upper-level undergraduate and graduate programs to residents of Hagerstown and its surrounding region.

The collaborating institutions are:
Coppin State University
Frostburg State University
Towson University
Salisbury University
University of Maryland, College Park
University of Maryland Global Campus

The University System of Maryland at Hagerstown is a member of the University System of Maryland.

External links
Official site

Frostburg State University
University of Maryland, Baltimore
University of Maryland Global Campus
University System of Maryland
Buildings and structures in Hagerstown, Maryland
Two year upper class colleges
Educational institutions established in 2005
Universities and colleges in Washington County, Maryland
2005 establishments in Maryland